Wing Lake is a reservoir in Washington County in the U.S. state of Missouri.

Wing Lake was so named on account of its outline having the form of a wing.

References

Bodies of water of Washington County, Missouri
Reservoirs in Missouri
Buildings and structures in Washington County, Missouri